USNS John Ericsson (T-AO-194) is a Henry J. Kaiser-class underway replenishment oiler operated by the Military Sealift Command to support ships of the United States Navy.

Design
The Henry J. Kaiser-class replenishment oilers were preceded by the shorter Cimarron-class fleet replenishment oilers.

They were built without armaments but can be fitted with close-in weapon systems. The ship has a helicopter platform but not any maintenance facilities. It has a complement of eighty-nine civilians (nineteen officers), twenty-nine spare crew, and six United States Navy crew.

Construction and delivery
John Ericsson, the eighth ship of the Henry J. Kaiser class, was laid down at Sun Shipbuilding and Drydock Company at Chester, Pennsylvania, on 15 March 1989 and launched on 21 April 1990. She entered non-commissioned United States Navy service under the control of the Military Sealift Command with a primarily civilian crew on 18 March 1991.

Service history
John Ericsson serves in the United States Pacific Fleet. In March 2014, she was sent to help with refueling and logistics connected with the USS Pinckneys role in helping the search for missing Malaysia Airlines Flight 370.

Photos

References

External links

 NavSource Online: Service Ship Photo Archive: USNS John Ericsson (T-AO-194)
 USNS John Ericcson (T-AO 194)

 

Henry J. Kaiser-class oilers
Cold War auxiliary ships of the United States
1990 ships
Ships built by the Sun Shipbuilding & Drydock Company